NOAA-4, also known as ITOS-G was a weather satellite operated by the National Oceanic and Atmospheric Administration (NOAA). It was part of a series of satellites called ITOS, or improved TIROS. NOAA-4 was launched on a Delta rocket on November 15, 1974. The launch carried two other satellites: AMSAT-OSCAR 7 and Intasat. It remained operational for 1463 days until it was deactivated by NOAA on November 18, 1978.

References

1974 in spaceflight
Weather satellites of the United States
Spacecraft launched in 1974

External links
 NOAA-4 Satellite Position